Orthotylus elongatus is a species of bug from the Miridae family that is endemic to Cyprus.

References

Insects described in 1965
Endemic arthropods of Cyprus
Hemiptera of Europe
elongatus